Eremobium is a genus of flowering plants belonging to the family Brassicaceae.

Its native range is Southern and Eastern Mediterranean to Arabian Peninsula.

Species
Species:
 Eremobium aegyptiacum (Spreng.) Asch. ex Boiss.

References

Brassicaceae
Brassicaceae genera